The Limón Dam, part of the Olmos Transandino Project, is an under construction multi-purpose concrete-face rock-fill embankment dam on the Huancabamba River in northwestern Peru, located to the south of Guabal. The greatest feature and engineering challenge of the project was digging the  trans-Andean tunnel as it connects the Atlantic side of the Andes (Amazon basin) with the Pacific side.

The Olmos Irrigation Project is the largest of seven irrigation projects in Peru.

History and construction 
The idea to divert the Huancabamba River to the fertile but arid lands of Olmos was first envisioned in 1924. The hydroelectric component was added in the 1940s and 1950s. Preliminary feasibility studies were conducted in the 1960s by Italconsult, in 1979-1982 soviet engineers from Hydroproject prepared and approved new design Tunnel excavation had been occurring since the 1950s and through the 1970s but work was halted in the 1980s due to a lack of funding. Construction on the project began in 2006 with the dam and Brazil's Odebrecht drilling the tunnel with a tunnel boring machine (TBM). Of the tunnel's  total length,  is being dug with a TBM. The dam was completed in 2009 and its reservoir began to impound the river. The tunnel was completed on 20 December 2011 with a ceremony attended by Peru's President Ollanta Humala. In June 2010, H2Olmos S.A. was awarded the contract for the irrigation system and it is expected to be operational in 2013. The contract for the hydroelectric component, which is planned to consist of two power stations, was awarded to Sindicato Energético S.A. in June 2010.

Project characteristics 
Water diverted by the dam is transferred via the tunnel to the Olmos River where it will be used to irrigate  of land. From there, water continues down the Olmos River where at two points, it will be used at hydroelectric power stations. The Palo Verde Dam will serve as a diversion dam and shift water from the reservoir to the remaining  of farmland.

Popular culture
The project was profiled in the May 18, 2009 episode of Build it Bigger and the March 19, 2014 episode of Strip the City.  It also featured in an episode of Mega Construction.

References 

Buildings and structures in Lambayeque Region
Buildings and structures in Cajamarca Region
Irrigation in Peru
Reservoirs in Peru
Tunnels in Peru
Water tunnels
Dams in Peru
Concrete-face rock-fill dams
Dams completed in 2009
2009 establishments in Peru